Mario Esposito is an Italian paralympic archer. He won the bronze medal at the Men's team recurve event at the 2008 Summer Paralympics in Beijing.

References

External links
 

Italian male archers
Living people
Paralympic bronze medalists for Italy
Paralympic archers of Italy
Archers at the 2008 Summer Paralympics
Year of birth missing (living people)
Medalists at the 2008 Summer Paralympics
Paralympic medalists in archery
21st-century Italian people